Four corners is a children's game, often played in elementary schools. The object of the game is for players to choose corners of the room and not get caught by the designated "It" player until they are the last remaining participant.

Gameplay
To begin, four corners (or general areas) of the room are marked from the numbers one to four. One player is designated to be "It," or the "counter." This player sits in the middle of the room and closes their eyes, or exits the room, and counts to ten. The remaining players choose any one of the corners and quietly go and stand in that area. When the "It" player has finished counting, they call out one of the numbers. All players who had chosen that corner or area are out of the game, and they sit down. Then, "It" counts again, and the remaining players move to a different corner, unless the corner is out.

The last person to still be in the game wins, and usually becomes the new "It."

If "It" calls out a corner containing no players, they either call out another number right away or the players rotate to a new corner, according to different versions of gameplay.

Canadian game
A different 5-player children's game is played in Canada under the name "four corners" (also known as "king's court"). It is played on a large square drawn in chalk, usually in a schoolyard or other similar area. Four of the children stand on one of the corners of the square, while the fifth player is designated "it" and stands in the middle of the square. The four corner players then attempt to trade places without being tagged by the player who is "it", or without vacating a corner long enough for the player who is "it" being able to stand in the vacant corner. If a corner player is tagged or stranded without a free corner to stand in, they become "it". A common strategy is to try to swap corners while the player who is "it" is chasing other players who are trying to swap corners.

French game 
The rules are the same as in the Canadian game, but the fifth player is designated the "chamber pot".  In L'Enfant, French author Jules Vallès calls "it" just the "pot".

Indian game 
In some parts of India, a game similar to the Canadian game is played called "Nalugu Stambalata" (Four-poles game). Each corner of the square has a pole/pillar which the players attempt to touch.

See also 

 Puss in the corner (children's game)

References 

Children's games
Tag variants